Hundvåg Church is a parish church of the Church of Norway in Stavanger Municipality in Rogaland county, Norway. It is located on the island of Hundvåg in the borough of Hundvåg in the northeastern part of the city of Stavanger. It is the church for the Hundvåg parish which is part of the Stavanger domprosti (arch-deanery) in the Diocese of Stavanger. The red brick church was built in a rectangular design in 1983 using designs by the architects Knut and Ingeborg Hoem. The church seats about 540 people.

History
The earliest existing historical records of the church date back to the year 1300, but it was likely built in the mid-1100s. The church was probably a small Romanesque stone church. The church was no longer regularly used after the mid-1600s and from then on, the islanders had to travel to the nearby Frue Church on the mainland. By 1745, the church had become a ruin. In the 19th century, the stones from the old church were used to help restore the nearby Stavanger Cathedral, and at that time, the foundation was leveled and all traces of the old church were gone.

See also
List of churches in Rogaland
Informationen zur Jehmlich Orgel in der Kirche in Stavanger-Hundsvåg

References

Churches in Stavanger
Brick churches in Norway
20th-century Church of Norway church buildings
Churches completed in 1983
12th-century establishments in Norway